Infiniti Mall is a chain of shopping malls in India. It is a subsidiary of K Raheja Realty, which has been in the business of construction and property development since the 1960s. The first Infiniti Mall opened in 2004, in Andheri, Mumbai. This is the third oldest shopping mall in Mumbai. Infiniti Mall launched their second property in Mumbai, at Malad, in May 2011.

Infiniti Mall, Andheri

Infiniti Mall, Andheri located at Oshiwara Link Road, Andheri (West), was built in 2004 and is spread across  with 64 stores, a six-screen multiplex (PVR Icon), food court, Family Entertainment Center and restaurants besides shopping. The Andheri branch is the third oldest mall in Mumbai, as well as the second oldest in Mumbai Suburban.

Infiniti Mall, Malad

Infiniti Mall (Malad) by K Raheja Realty. Mumbai has been a hub for some of the world’s greatest malls that are largely known for their entertainment quotient, games, and fashion. Infiniti Mall in Malad West, Mumbai by K Raheja Realty is one elite destination that is a hub for all age groups on the lookout for world-class facilities under the same roof. Located in one of Mumbai’s most thriving and buzzing locations, Malad West. Infiniti Mall is a quintessential retail mix that introduces you to the exemplary fusion of innovation & technology. Ensconced between the most coveted neighboring areas like Kandivali, Borivali & Goregaon, it has transformed shopping & leisure for many. This strategically built premium space gives you a multitude of experiences with its versatile interiors that feature multiple outlets of entertainment, food & shopping without becoming a distraction for the others. Another niche component of this massive space is that it is the only indoor 360° roller coaster ride in India. Besides being a hub for multiple lifestyle activities, Infiniti mall is an exquisite spot of attraction in the city of Mumbai, it’s got in store the best attractions & hints of the city’s diverse culture promising an unparalleled experience complemented by comfort & luxury. The mall houses 950 seater multi-cuisine food court spread across an area spamming 35,000 sq. ft, with more than 40 dining and café selections to choose from & PVR Cinemas, India's leading movie multiplex offers the ultimate experience of watching movies in the comfort of reclining chairs and digital screens.

References

 

Shopping malls established in 2004
Shopping malls in Mumbai
2004 establishments in Maharashtra